Cyperus flavescens, commonly known as the yellow flatsedge, is a species of flowering plant belonging to the family Cyperaceae.

It has cosmopolitan distribution.

Taxonomy

Synonyms
Pycreus flavescens

See also
List of Cyperus species

References

flavescens
Taxa named by Carl Linnaeus